The 2011 Japanese Formula 3 Championship was the 33rd edition of the Japanese Formula 3 Championship. It commenced on May 14 at Suzuka and ended on September 24 at Sportsland SUGO after 16 races held at seven race meetings. It had been due to start there on 16 April, but was delayed due to the Tōhoku earthquake and tsunami that hit Japan in March.

Teams and drivers
All teams were Japanese-registered.

Notes

Race calendar and results
 All races were held in Japan.

Championship standings

Drivers' Championships
Points are awarded as follows:

Teams' Championships
Points are awarded for races as follows:

Engine Tuners' Championship
Points are awarded for races as follows:

References

External links
 Official Site 

Formula Three
Japanese Formula 3 Championship seasons
Japan
Japanese Formula 3